The 1992 Munster Senior Hurling Championship Final was contested by Limerick and Cork, and took place on 5 July 1992 at the Páirc Uí Chaoimh in Cork. Cork captained by Ger FitzGerald won the game by 1-22 to 3-11.

Route to the final

Cork

Limerick

Details

References

External links
Match Highlights
Match Programme

Munster
Munster Senior Hurling Championship Finals
Cork county hurling team matches
Hurling in County Limerick